Palatopharyngeal may refer to:

 Palatopharyngeal arch
 Palatopharyngeus muscle, also known as palatopharyngeal muscle